Hankyong National University is the only national university in Gyeonggi Province. It is located in Anseong, a city approximately 80 kilometres from Seoul. The university specialises in fields such as environmental engineering, agricultural science, biotechnology, information technology and computer engineering. It was founded in 1939.

Notable people
Song Seung-heon, actor

See also
List of national universities in South Korea
List of universities and colleges in South Korea
Education in Korea

External links
 
Campus Map

Educational institutions established in 1939
Universities and colleges in Gyeonggi Province
National universities and colleges in South Korea
Anseong
1939 establishments in Korea